Kenneth Kilby Hawkes (6 May 1933 – 2 February 2015) was an English professional footballer best known as a player for Luton Town.

Career

Joining Luton Town as a trainee in 1951, Hawkes broke into the first-team only in 1957. He made 102 appearances for Luton, including playing in the 1959 FA Cup Final, before leaving in 1961 to join Peterborough United. After a solitary first-team appearance for Peterborough, Hawkes played non-league football for Bedford Town, St Neots Town and Dunstable Town.

His younger brother Barry also played League football for teams including Luton Town.

References

1933 births
2015 deaths
Sportspeople from Easington, County Durham
Footballers from County Durham
English footballers
Association football defenders
English Football League players
Luton Town F.C. players
Peterborough United F.C. players
Bedford Town F.C. players
St Neots Town F.C. players
Dunstable Town F.C. players
FA Cup Final players